A , also referred to in English as a black corporation or black business, is a Japanese term for an exploitative sweatshop-type employment system.

While the term "sweatshop" is associated with manufacturing, and the garment trade in particular, in Japan black companies are not necessarily associated with the clothing industry, but more often with office work.

Etymology
The term "black company" was coined in the early 2000s by young IT workers but has since come to be applied to various industries.

Conditions
While specifics may vary from workplace to workplace and company to company, a typical practice at a black company is to hire a large number of young employees and then force them to work large amounts of overtime without overtime pay. Conditions are poor, and workers are subjected to verbal abuse and "power harassment" (bullying) by their superiors. 
In order to make the employees stay, superiors of black companies would often threaten young employees with disrepute if they chose to quit.

Noteworthy cases
Mina Mori, a 26-year-old employee of the restaurant chain Watami, committed suicide two months after joining the company in 2008. Her family lodged a complaint with the Yokosuka Labor Standards Office to seek recognition of the suicide as work-related. When their claim was denied, they appealed it to the Kanagawa Prefectural Labor Bureau, which recognized work-related stress as the cause of the decline of her mental health. In December 2015, Watami reached an out-of-court settlement of 130 million yen with the family, and Watami founder Miki Watanabe apologized.

Media coverage
The issue of black companies has attracted attention in Japan. The 2009 drama film On The Verge At a Black Company was set in such a workplace, and in 2012 there was a "Black Corporations Award" where people could vote on "the most evil corporation of the year".

In 2013 a DVD titled Black Kigyō ni Go-yōjin (Beware of Black Companies) was released.

The protagonist of the manga ReLIFE and those of many isekai manga worked at black companies.

In the manga and anime series The Laughing Salesman, one of the victims/protagonist worked at Black Corporation and contemplated suicide before meeting the Laughing Salesman. As punishment for mistreating his own employees after becoming the head of his own company, the Laughing Salesman places him in a black company experience booth.

In the multimedia project Hypnosis Mic: Division Rap Battle, the character Doppo Kannonzaka is an office worker at a black company. He lists his work as a reason of his depression but continues to work with them because he has no choice.

The spinoff of manga and anime series Cells at Work! called Cells at Work! Code Black characterizes the body of an unhealthy, stressed, alcoholic individual as a black company in comparison to that of a healthy human being.

The manga Zombie 100: Bucket List of the Dead also known as Zom 100: Zombie ni Naru made ni Shitai 100 no Koto starts with the main character Akira working for a black company for three years leaving him disillusioned with life.

One of the targets in the video game Persona 5 is Kunikazu Okumura, the CEO of black company Okumura Foods, which is using the Metaverse to manufacture scandals in rival companies and has become infamous for horrendous working conditions. Within his Palace, employees are depicted as robots that are severely overworked and incinerated upon collapsing from exhaustion, with breaks that last as little as five seconds. During the end boss fight, Shadow Okumura forces the robots to fight the Phantom Thieves, even ordering them to self-destruct, but ends up depleting his workforce entirely.

References

Japanese business terms
Manufacturing in Japan
Ethically disputed working conditions
Employment in Japan
Labor in Japan